Current and historic literary awards in New Zealand include:

See also 

 New Zealand literature

References 

Literary awards
 
New Zealand literary